Jersey Shore Shark Attack is a 2012 television film that aired on Syfy on June 8, 2012 and was written by Michael Ciminera and Richard Gnolfo. It was built around the popularity of the well-known MTV program, Jersey Shore.

Plot
The film centers around a series of deadly shark attacks in New Jersey.
Drilling for a new park attracts rare sharks which slowly devour the tourists. In the middle of the movie, the character "Nookie" is invited over to a yacht party which turns deadly as the sharks attack the vessel. They are rescued and they move on to save the main character's dad who had jumped in the water to save a stranded girl. At the end a reporter says that the attacks are over. However, a shark jumps out of the water and the screen cuts to black. The torment is far from over.

Cast
 Jeremy Luke as Gino "The Complication" Moretti
 Melissa Molinaro as Nicolina "Nooki" Santamaria
 William Atherton as Dolan
 Daniel Booko as Paulie 
 Vinny Guadagnino as Joe Conte 
 Alex Mauriello as "J-Moni"
 Audi Resendez as "B.J."
 Joey Russo as Donnie 
 Tony Sirico as Captain Salie
 Jack Scalia as Sheriff Moretti 
 Paul Sorvino as Mayor Palantine
 Grant Harvey as Bradford
 Al Sapienza as Mike 
 Dylan Vox as Spencer 
 Gabrielle Christian as Penelope
 Joey Fatone as himself

References

External links 

 

2012 television films
2012 films
Films about sharks
Films set in New Jersey
Jersey Shore
Syfy original films
Films shot in New Jersey
Films shot in Los Angeles
Films about shark attacks
2010s English-language films
2010s American films